Nymphoides, or floatingheart, is a genus of aquatic flowering plants in the family Menyanthaceae. The genus name refers to their resemblance to the water lily Nymphaea. Nymphoides are aquatic plants with submerged roots and floating leaves that hold the small flowers above the water surface. Flowers are sympetalous, most often divided into five lobes (petals). The petals are either yellow or white, and may be adorned with lateral wings or covered in small hairs. The inflorescence consists of either an umbellate cluster of flowers or a lax raceme, with internodes occurring between generally paired flowers.

Species of Nymphoides are sold as aquarium plants, including the "banana plant", N. aquatica and the "water snowflake", N. indica. Species native to the United States are N. cordata in the northeast and N. aquatica in the southeast. Nymphoides peltata is native to Europe and Asia, but can be found in the United States as an invasive aquatic weed. The non-native species N. cristata and N. indica also reportedly occur in Florida (Jacono 2000).

Nymphoides hydrophylla slim stem (spear) are used as vegetable at Meinong District, Kaohsiung, Taiwan.

Numerous species of Nymphoides grow in Australia, and others exist in Africa, America, and Asia.

Species

There are approximately 50 species of Nymphoides, including:

Pantropical:
 Nymphoides indica (L.) Kuntze

Africa:
 Nymphoides bosseri A.Raynal
 Nymphoides brevipedicellata (Vatke) A.Raynal
 Nymphoides elegans A.Raynal
 Nymphoides ezannoi Berhaut
 Nymphoides forbesiana (Griseb.) Kuntze
 Nymphoides guineensis A.Raynal
 Nymphoides humilis A.Raynal
 Nymphoides milnei A.Raynal
 Nymphoides moratiana A.Raynal
 Nymphoides rautaneni (N.E.Br.) A.Raynal
 Nymphoides tenuissima A.Raynal
 Nymphoides thunbergiana (Griseb.) Kuntze

North America:
 Nymphoides aquatica (J.F.Gmel.) Kuntze
 Nymphoides cordata (Elliott) Fernald

Central and South America:
 Nymphoides fallax Ornduff
 Nymphoides flaccida L.Sm.
 Nymphoides grayana (Griseb.) Kuntze
 Nymphoides herzogii A.Galàn-Mera & G.Navarro
 Nymphoides humboldtiana (Kunth) Kuntze
 Nymphoides microphylla (A.St.-Hil.) Kuntze
 Nymphoides verrucosa (R.E.Fries)A.Galàn-Mera & G.Navarro

Eurasia:
 Nymphoides peltata (S.G.Gmel.) Kuntze

Asia:
 Nymphoides balakrishnanii P.Biju, Josekutty, Haneef & Augustine
 Nymphoides coreana (Léveille) Hara
 Nymphoides hastata (Dop) Kerr
 Nymphoides hydrophylla (Lour.) Kuntze
 Nymphoides krishnakesara K.T.Joseph & Sivar.
 Nymphoides lungtanensis S.P.Li, T.H.Hsieh & C.C.Lin
 Nymphoides macrospermum Vasudevan
 Nymphoides siamensis (Ostenf.) Kerr
 Nymphoides sivarajanii K.T.Joseph
 Nymphoides tonkinensis (Dop) P.H.Ho

Asia and Australia:
 Nymphoides aurantiaca (Dalzell) Kuntze
 Nymphoides parvifolia (Wall.) Kuntze

Australia:
 Nymphoides beaglensis Aston
 Nymphoides crenata (F.Muell.) Kuntze
 Nymphoides disperma Aston
 Nymphoides elliptica Aston
 Nymphoides exigua (F.Muell.) Kuntze
 Nymphoides exiliflora (F.Muell.) Kuntze
 Nymphoides furculifolia Specht
 Nymphoides geminata (R.Br.) Kuntze
 Nymphoides hydrocharioides (F.Muell.) Kuntze
 Nymphoides montana Aston
 Nymphoides planosperma Aston
 Nymphoides quadriloba Aston
 Nymphoides simulans Aston
 Nymphoides spinulosperma Aston
 Nymphoides spongiosa Aston
 Nymphoides stygia (J.M.Black) H.Eichler
 Nymphoides subacuta Aston
 Nymphoides triangularis Aston

References

Jacono, C. 2000. Know Nymphoides. Aquaphyte 22 (supplemental insert) 
Nymphoides minima

 
Asterales genera